The Brabham BT21 was an open-wheel formula racing car, designed, developed, and built by Brabham in large numbers in 1966 and delivered to private individuals; 110 vehicles were manufactured.

Most were manufactured as Formula 3 cars, with some built for US Formula B and given the designation 21B. The wagons for the Formule Libre ran under the identifier 21C.

The first BT21s came to international racetracks in 1966. The chassis was flatter than the BT18, the suspension was revised and the body was completely rebuilt. This drove the rear wheels through a Hewland Mk.4 five-speed manual transmission. The chassis was constructed out of a tubular space frame, with a lightweight fibreglass body. This meant the car was very light and nimble, weighing in at only .

Private drivers like Peter Westbury with his Felday Engineering Ltd. had much success with the BT21 in 1967. In 1968 the BT21 became a serious opponent with the new Tecno and the victories in Formula 3 became fewer.

The BT21B, therefore, underwent some changes. The car got wider wheels and a sturdier tubular space frame derived from the BT23, a Formula 2 car. This eliminated the shortcomings. In 1969 the BT21 was slowly being replaced by the BT28.

References

Open wheel racing cars
Brabham racing cars
Formula Three cars